The Island of Peace massacre was a mass murder attack that occurred at the Island of Peace site in Naharayim on March 13, 1997, in which a Jordanian soldier opened fire at a large group of Israeli schoolgirls from the AMIT Fuerst (Fürst) School of Beit Shemesh, who were on a class field trip, killing seven of them and injuring six others, before a group of Jordanian soldiers seized him and rushed to help the victims.

The perpetrator, Ahmad Daqamseh, was diagnosed with antisocial personality disorder by a Jordanian medical team. A five-member military tribunal subsequently sentenced him to 20 years in prison with hard labour.

Shortly after the attack, King Hussein went to offer condolences to families of the victims; it was seen as a sincere and an unusual act in the history of the Israeli-Arab conflict, which deeply moved the mourning Israeli public and helped improve the relationship between the two countries after the attack.

Daqamseh was later called a "hero" by Jordanian politician Hussein Mjalli, and a petition circulated in the Jordanian parliament in 2013 where MPs alleged that he had finished his sentence. Daqamseh was released on 12 March 2017 after completing his sentence. He expressed pride for his actions, and showed no signs of remorse.

The attack

On Thursday, March 13, 1997, 80 seventh- and eighth-grade schoolgirls from the Fuerst (Fürst) School of Beit Shemesh, west of Jerusalem, were on a field trip to the Jordan Valley and the Golan Heights. Part of the trip was to Naharayim, visiting the "Island of Peace", a joint Israeli-Jordanian tourist resort under Jordanian rule.

During the afternoon, the class reached the "Island of Peace" site and the girls got off the bus. As they were heading towards the observatory, a Jordanian soldier stationed at the site opened fire on the group with an M16 rifle.

The perpetrator killed seven schoolgirls and wounded five others and a teacher before his rifle jammed, and Jordanian soldiers rushed to help the victims after seizing him while yelling "Madman! Madman!".

Fatalities

Memorial
The memorial site was founded by members of neighbouring kibbutz Ashdot Ya'akov. It shows 7 white small hills for every murdered girl with her name "written" by flowers.

The perpetrator
The perpetrator was Jordanian Army Corporal Ahmed Daqamseh, who stated that he attacked because he was insulted and angered that the girls were whistling and clapping while he was praying.

Speaking on Al Jazeera in May 2001, Daqamseh's mother said, "I am proud of my son, and I hold my head high. My son did a heroic deed and has pleased god and his own conscience. My son lifts my head and the head of the entire Arab and Islamic nation. I am proud of any Muslim who does what Ahmad did. I hope that I am not saying something wrong. When my son went to prison, they asked him: 'Ahmad, do you regret it?' He answered: 'I have no regrets.' He treated everyone to coffee, honored all the other prisoners, and said: The only thing that I am angry about is the gun, which did not work properly. Otherwise I would have killed all of the passengers on the bus."

Aftermath 
The attack carried a resemblance to an incident where an Israeli Army clerk fired on a group of Palestinians in the Hebron vegetable market on 1 January 1997, wounding seven. He too was found to be mentally unstable by the Israeli authorities. Other media outlets drew parallels with the 1994 Cave of the Patriarchs massacre, where an Israeli Army reserve captain killed 29 and injured 125 in a Hebron mosque.

There were reports from Amman that hundreds of Jordanian soldiers had lined up to donate blood at the hospital where the girls were taken.

Jordanian reaction 
After Daqamseh was captured, the Jordanian army officially announced that Daqamseh was mentally ill. A specialized medical team diagnosed him with antisocial personality disorder.

On March 16, 1997, a few days after the attack, King Hussein of Jordan personally apologized for the incident, traveling to Israel to visit and pay respects to the grieving families of the seven murdered girls during the traditional Jewish mourning ceremony known as shiva. King Hussein's visit to the parents of the victims was broadcast live in Israel and Jordan. During the visit, in which King Hussein stood alongside Israeli Prime Minister Benjamin Netanyahu, he expressed an apology on behalf of the Kingdom of Jordan telling the parents, "Your daughter is like my daughter. Your loss is my loss." He added that they were all "members of one family" and that the shooting was "a crime that is a shame for all of us... I feel as if I have lost a child of my own. If there is any purpose in life it will be to make sure that all the children no longer suffer the way our generation did."

Afterwards King Hussein also visited the wounded schoolgirls in the hospital, and offered to provide financial compensation to the families affected by the attack.

King Hussein's sincere act was an unusual act in the history of the Arab–Israeli conflict which deeply moved the mourning Israeli public and helped improve the relationship between the two countries after the attack. Nevertheless, various Jordanian individuals and groups criticized King Hussein's act for prostrating himself before Israel.

Trial and conviction 

While the majority of Jordanians disapproved of the attacks and expressed sympathy for the victims, Daqamseh became a hero to some Jordanians who opposed normalization with Israel. Police prevented a pilgrimage to his house, and 200 Jordanian lawyers led by the Jordanian Bar Association competed to represent him.

In July 1997, a five-member Jordanian military tribunal found Daqamseh guilty of killing the Israeli schoolgirls and sentenced him to 20 years with hard labour in prison. He could have faced the death penalty but the tribunal spared him because he was determined to be mentally unstable.

Jordan’s justice minister's call for Daqamseh's release 

On February 14, 2011, Jordan's new justice minister Hussein Mjalli joined dozens of protesters in demanding the early release of Daqamseh. Mjalli, a long-time oppositionist, was appointed to the position as a result of the 2011 Jordanian protests, part of the larger Arab Spring against the region's established regimes.

Mjalli previously served as the defense lawyer of Daqamseh in his 1997 trial. As an Arab nationalist opposed to the 1994 Israel–Jordan peace treaty, Mjalli views Daqamseh as a hero who should not be in prison. The Israeli Foreign Ministry issued a statement saying that Mjalli's comments were received in Israel with "revulsion and shock." Israeli Embassy spokeswoman Merav Horsandi said it "is difficult for us to comprehend how there are people who support the release of a cold-blooded murderer of young children."

To allay Israeli concerns and anger regarding a possible early release, Jordan's foreign ministry issued a statement reassuring that Daqamseh would serve out his life sentence and that Mjalli had just expressed his personal opinion.

Jordanian parliament calls for Daqamseh's release 

In April 2013, 110 of 120 Jordanian Members of Parliament signed a petition calling for the release of Daqamseh. The petition called for a special pardon to release him. The cause of the petition is that Daqamseh allegedly finished his sentence.

The families of the seven murdered schoolgirls expressed outrage over the petition and vowed to do everything in their power to thwart Daqamseh's release. Nurit Fatihi, mother of Sivan Fatihi, said: "I expected [Daqamseh] to rot in jail, but I see I can’t count on the Jordanian court and authorities to promote justice. We’ve addressed government officials in the past, but it didn’t really help... Just like I will never see my daughter again, so too he does not deserve to see his family. Every one of the girls would have a family and children by now." On April 15, 2013, during Yom Hazikaron, the families of the victims held a memorial service in front of the Jordanian embassy in Ramat Gan. At the end of the ceremony, the Jordanian ambassador, Walid Khalid Obeidat, invited the parents into the embassy, and assured them that Daqamesh would not be released at the time.

Daqamseh's release
On 12 March 2017, Daqamseh was released, after completing his prison term of 20 years.

"We respect the Jordanian judiciary, and now we can only remember the image of King Hussein consoling the families of the victims," commented Alice Wells, then American ambassador to Jordan, when asked about the embassy's opinion on Daqamseh's release.

References

External links 
 Peres Prime Minister Netanyahu on Shooting in Naharayim - published at the Israeli Ministry of Foreign Affairs
 Jordanian Soldier Kills 7 Israeli Schoolgirls - published on the New York Times on March 14, 1997
 Hussein, on His Knees, Begs Forgiveness for Massacre; Jordanian King Visits Families of Slain Israeli Girls - published on the Washington Post on March 17, 1997

Israel–Jordan relations
Mass murder in 1997
Massacres in 1997
Israel–Jordan border
Terrorist incidents in Asia in 1997 
Terrorist incidents in Israel in 1997 
Terrorist incidents in Jordan in the 1990s 
Terrorist incidents in Jordan 
Massacres of women
Murdered Israeli children
March 1997 events in Asia
March 1997 crimes
1997 in Jordan
1990s murders in Jordan
1997 crimes in Jordan
1997 murders in Asia
Murder in Jordan
Incidents of violence against girls
Massacres in Jordan
Violence against women in Jordan